Streptophlebia bicellulata is a moth of the family Erebidae first described by William James Kaye in 1918. It is found on the Philippines.

References

Moths described in 1912
Syntomini